Yargelis Savigne Herrera (born 13 November 1984 in Niceto Pérez, Guantanamo) is a Cuban athlete competing in the triple jump and long jump.

Her international breakthrough came in 2005, when she, competing in both the triple and long jump events at the 2005 World Championships, won a silver medal and finished fourth, respectively. She continued her form throughout the year to place third at the World Athletics Final with 14.81.

She won a gold medal at the 2007 World Championships in the triple jump, with a distance of 15.28 m. At the 2008 World Indoor Championships, Savigne lay in second before her final attempt, with an area record of 14.95 m, behind Hrysopiyi Devetzi's Greek record of 15.00 m. However, Savigne jumped 15.05 m on her final attempt to take the gold medal.

Savigne won her second major outdoor gold medal at the 2009 World Championships. Her jump of 14.95 m was enough to win in a modest competition which saw compatriot Mabel Gay take silver with 14.61 m. The following year she won the silver medal at the 2010 IAAF World Indoor Championships, finishing behind Olga Rypakova who made the third longest indoor jump ever for the gold. In the outdoor season, she improved her long jump best to 6.91 m in Reims at a meeting on the Alma Athlé Tour, despite having trouble with her right ankle. She remained focused on her triple jump speciality, however, aiming to return to her 2007 peak form.

Personal bests

All information taken from IAAF profile.

Achievements

References

External links

Tilastopaja biography
Ecured biography (in Spanish)

1984 births
Living people
Cuban female triple jumpers
Cuban female long jumpers
Athletes (track and field) at the 2007 Pan American Games
Athletes (track and field) at the 2008 Summer Olympics
Athletes (track and field) at the 2011 Pan American Games
Athletes (track and field) at the 2012 Summer Olympics
Olympic athletes of Cuba
Sportspeople from Guantánamo
World Athletics Championships medalists
Pan American Games gold medalists for Cuba
Pan American Games silver medalists for Cuba
Pan American Games bronze medalists for Cuba
Pan American Games medalists in athletics (track and field)
Diamond League winners
World Athletics Indoor Championships winners
World Athletics Championships winners
Medalists at the 2007 Pan American Games
Medalists at the 2011 Pan American Games
21st-century Cuban women